Charadra franclemonti is a moth of the family Noctuidae. It is found from central Arizona (Coconino Co.) southward to at least Durango in Mexico.

The length of the forewings is 18 mm for males and 19 mm for females. Adults are on wing from mid-July into August.

Larvae have been reared on Quercus gambelii.

Etymology
It is named after the late John G. Franclemont who collected and reared this species and recognized that there were two distinct species in southern Arizona.

External links
The North American species of Charadra Walker, with a revision of the Charadra pata (Druce) group (Noctuidae, Pantheinae)

Pantheinae
Moths described in 2010